Motwica  is a village in the administrative district of Gmina Sosnówka, within Biała Podlaska County, Lublin Voivodeship, in eastern Poland.

In Motwica was born one of the greatest polish papyrologists Kamil Bujalski.

References

Villages in Biała Podlaska County